Comproportionation or synproportionation is a chemical reaction where two reactants containing the same element but with different oxidation numbers, form a compound having an intermediate oxidation number. It is the opposite of disproportionation.

Frost diagrams

The tendency of two species to disproportionate or comproportionate can be determined by examining the Frost diagram of the oxidation states; if a species' value of ΔG/F is lower than the line joining the two oxidation numbers on either side of it, then it is more stable and if in a solution, these two species will undergo comproportionation.

A Frost Diagram is another way of displaying the reduction potentials for the various oxidation states of a given element, X. It shows nE against the oxidation number N: here, E is the reduction potential for the X(N)/X(0) couple, and n is the number of electrons transferred in the conversion of X(N) to X(0)

Examples
 In lead batteries, the spontaneous reaction is:
 Pb + PbO2 + 2 H2SO4 → 2 PbSO4 + 2 H2O  
The laboratory preparation of manganese dioxide involves comproportionation of Mn(II) and Mn(VII) reagents:
2  + 3  + 2 → 5  +  + 2 
 15 Se + SeCl4 + 4 AlCl3 → 2 Se8[AlCl4]2
 In the Claus Process, two gaseous compounds of sulfur comproportionate in the presence of a catalyst to give elemental sulfur:
2 H2S + SO2 → 3 S + 2 H2O
 In halogen chemistry:
IO3− + 5 I− + 6 H + → 3 I2 + 3 H2O
 In anammox chemistry:
 NH4+ + NO2− → N2 + 2H2O

Iron(III) chloride reacts with iron powder to form iron(II) chloride:

References 

Chemical reactions